Lone Fighter is a 1923 American silent Western film directed by Albert Russell and starring J.B. Warner, Vester Pegg, and Josephine Hill.

Plot
As described in a film magazine review, Certain Lee, a Texas Ranger, is trailing an outlaw band headed by Macklyn Vance. Lee falls in love with Rose Trimball. She is convinced by Vance that Lee is responsible for the jailing of Harvey Bates, the man she had promised to marry. Rose betrays Lee into the hands of the gang. He escapes after his horse assists in untying his bonds. Bates breaks out of jail and tells Rose that Vance is his enemy. Bates and Vance meet, fight at the edge of a cliff, fall over and are killed. Lee then wins the affections of Rose.

Cast
 J.B. Warner as Certain Lee
 Vester Pegg as Harvey Bates
 Josephine Hill as Rose Trimball
 Joe Ryan as Macklyn Vance
 Jim Gamble as Patrick Trimball

References

External links
 

1923 films
1923 Western (genre) films
American black-and-white films
Films directed by Albert Russell
Silent American Western (genre) films
1920s English-language films
1920s American films